Jean Nelissen (2 June 1936, Geleen, Netherlands – 1 September 2010, Maastricht, Netherlands) was a Dutch sports journalist and commentator. He was the uncle of racing cyclist Danny Nelissen.

References

1936 births
2010 deaths
Dutch sports journalists
People from Geleen
Cycling announcers
20th-century Dutch people